Mikael Svanberg (born 13 November 1972), better known as Lord Ahriman, is a Swedish musician and composer best known as the primary guitarist, songwriter and sole founding member of black metal band Dark Funeral. He is also the rhythm guitarist in the band Wolfen Society. His name is derived from Ahriman, the evil equivalent of the deity Angra Mainyu in Zoroastrianism.

Biography 
Originally from Luleå a small town in the north of Sweden, Ahriman developed an interest in music from a very young age. Hailing from a somewhat musical family, he cited his grandmother, mother and younger sister as influences and he started songwriting himself between 1989 and 1990.

Harbouring interests for Satanism (ostensibly that of the LaVeyan variant) and extreme metal as a teenager, he was introverted in his environment. When he was eighteen years old, he left for Stockholm, home to extreme metal acts such as Entombed and Dismember, whom Ahriman already knew personally.

He has also been an active participant in death metal. Before he played in Dark Funeral he played in a blackened death metal band called Satan's Disciples, and he has a side-project called Wolfen Society, who released an MCD "Conquer Divine" in 2001, although difficulties with No Fashion Records hindered its success.

Ahriman and other Dark Funeral members were forced to have side-jobs after No Fashion did not grant them royalties for their work on Dark Funeral's backcatalogue. Consequently Dark Funeral filed suit against No Fashion, and have since spearheaded a campaign against "corrupt" record labels. In October 2008, it was announced that Ahriman and Emperor Magus Caligula succeeded in obtaining the rights to Dark Funeral's entire backcatalogue.

In 2013, Ahriman and Dark Funeral signed to Century Media Records for their upcoming new studio album.

Discography

Dark Funeral

Studio releases 
 The Secrets of the Black Arts (1996)
 Vobiscum Satanas (1998)
 Diabolis Interium (2001)
 Attera Totus Sanctus (2005)
 Angelus Exuro pro Eternus (2009)
 Where Shadows Forever Reign (2016)
 We Are the Apocalypse (2022)

EPs 
 Dark Funeral (1994)
 Teach the Children to Worship Satan (2000)

Live releases 
 De Profundis Clamavi ad Te Domine (2004)

Compilations 
 In the Sign… (2000)

DVDs 
 Attera Orbis Terrarum - Part I (2007)
 Attera Orbis Terrarum - Part II (2008)

Wolfen Society

EPs 
 Conquer Divine (2001)

References

External links 
 Lord Ahriman's Facebook Page
 Lord Ahriman's Myspace Page
 Dark Funeral Official Website
 Dark Funeral Official Myspace Page
 Interview with Lord Ahriman

Black metal musicians
Black metal guitarists
Living people
Swedish Satanists
Swedish heavy metal guitarists
1972 births
Dark Funeral members